Boubacar Bangoura (born September 5, 1990 in Bamako, Mali) is a Malian football player who currently plays for Stade Malien. He formerly played for Algerian side JSM Béjaïa.

Club career
Bangoura began his career at the age of 10 in the junior ranks of Djoliba AC.

JSM Béjaïa
On December 4, 2012, it was announced that Coulibaly would join JSM Béjaïa on a 3-year contract.

References

1990 births
Malian footballers
Mali international footballers
Living people
Sportspeople from Bamako
Malian expatriate footballers
JSM Béjaïa players
Expatriate footballers in Algeria
Malian expatriate sportspeople in Algeria
Djoliba AC players
Association football forwards
21st-century Malian people